The Immigration Services Tribunal was a tribunal in the United Kingdom created by the Immigration and Asylum Act 1999 to hear:
 appeals from decisions of the Immigration Services Commissioner 
 disciplinary charges laid by the Immigration Services Commissioner under paragraph 9(1)(e) of Schedule 5 to the Immigration and Asylum Act 1999.

The Tribunal was abolished in January 2010 and its functions transferred to the First-tier Tribunal.

References

Former courts and tribunals in the United Kingdom
1999 establishments in the United Kingdom
2010 disestablishments in the United Kingdom
Courts and tribunals established in 1999
Courts and tribunals disestablished in 2010